Francisco Javier Álvarez Uría (born 1 February 1950) is a Spanish retired footballer who played as a left back.

Club career
Born in Gijón, Asturias, Uría played in La Liga during 11 consecutive seasons, starting with Real Oviedo in 1972–73. After the team's relegation the following year he signed with national powerhouse Real Madrid, being relatively used in two of his three seasons and winning his entire silverware.

In 1977, aged 27, Uría moved to Oviedo neighbours Sporting de Gijón, starting regularly during his spell as they achieved three top-five finishes, with four UEFA Cup participations. He retired at 34 after playing one year with his first club, now in the second division.

International career
Uría earned 14 caps for Spain during seven years, and participated in the 1978 FIFA World Cup and UEFA Euro 1980. His debut came on 21 October 1973 in a 1974 World Cup qualifier in Zagreb against Yugoslavia; that game ended 0–0, and both sides were level on points after the sixth round, thus having to compete in a playoff match (0–1 loss).

Honours
Real Madrid
La Liga: 1974–75, 1975–76
Copa del Generalísimo: 1974–75

References

External links

1950 births
Living people
Footballers from Gijón
Spanish footballers
Association football defenders
La Liga players
Segunda División players
Real Oviedo players
Real Madrid CF players
Sporting de Gijón players
Spain under-23 international footballers
Spain amateur international footballers
Spain international footballers
1978 FIFA World Cup players
UEFA Euro 1980 players